Aegeofusinus margaritae is a species of sea snail, a marine gastropod mollusk in the family Fasciolariidae, the spindle snails, the tulip snails and their allies.

Description

Distribution
This species occurs in the Aegean Sea.

References

 Buzzurro G. & Russo P. (2007). Fusinus del Mediterraneo. published by the authors, 280 p.
 Russo P. (2017). New genus Aegeofusinus (Gastropoda: Fasciolariidae) to include small endemic species of the Aegean sea. Bollettino Malacologico. 53: 63-68

margaritae
Gastropods described in 2007